Kamil Biliński (born 23 January 1988) is a Polish professional footballer who plays for Podbeskidzie Bielsko-Biała as a striker.

Club career
Biliński was born on January 23, 1988, in the city of Wroclaw. He began his senior career with Śląsk Wrocław in 2006, where he spent six seasons and took part in 26 league games.

From 2007 to 2013, he played for clubs such as Górnik Polkowice, Znicz Pruszków, Wisła Płock and Žalgiris.

He joined Dinamo București in 2013.

Dinamo București
On 3 January 2014, it was announced that Romanian side Dinamo București had reached an agreement for the transfer of Biliński, signing a -year deal for €530,000. In June 2015, he was released by Dinamo, a year before his contract expired.

International career
He was a part of Poland under-21 national football team.

Honours

Śląsk Wrocław
Ekstraklasa Cup: 2008–09

Žalgiris
A Lyga: 2013
A Lyga: Runner-up 2012
Lithuanian Football Cup: 2012–13
Lithuanian Supercup: 2013

Riga
Latvian Higher League: 2018
Latvian Football Cup: 2018

Individual
A Lyga top goal scorer: Runner-up 2013 (21 goals)
Žalgiris Vilnius Player of the Year: 2012, 2013

References

External links
 
 
 

1988 births
Living people
Sportspeople from Wrocław
Polish footballers
Poland under-21 international footballers
Polish expatriate footballers
Śląsk Wrocław players
Znicz Pruszków players
Górnik Polkowice players
Wisła Płock players
FK Žalgiris players
FC Dinamo București players
Riga FC players
Podbeskidzie Bielsko-Biała players
Ekstraklasa players
I liga players
II liga players
Liga I players
A Lyga players
Latvian Higher League players
Expatriate footballers in Lithuania
Polish expatriate sportspeople in Lithuania
Expatriate footballers in Romania
Polish expatriate sportspeople in Romania
Expatriate footballers in Latvia
Polish expatriate sportspeople in Latvia
Association football forwards